The Friends of the Saint Paul Chamber Orchestra is a non-profit cultural and educational organization based in St. Paul, Minnesota.  It was founded in 1975 by Lola May Thompson and Patricia Whitacre with the mission of supporting the activities of the Saint Paul Chamber Orchestra and incorporated in 1984.  It is one of the longest continuously operating auxiliary organizations for any professional American orchestra.

Activities and awards
The Friends of the Saint Paul Chamber Orchestra sponsors fundraising events, audience development events, classes in music appreciation, and biannual group tours of major musical centers in Europe.  It has won several awards from national arts organizations, the first one the 1996 "Outstanding Benefit of the Year" award from the League of American Orchestras for a fund-raising event organized by past presidents Kay Bendel and Betty Reichert in an airplane hangar in the downtown St. Paul airport. In 2003, the Friends of the Saint Paul Chamber Orchestra won a Silver Ribbon from the same organization for the classes in music appreciation that it offers to the public under the supervision of the musicologist Daniel E. Freeman.

With funding from the Patricia Whitacre Memorial Fund, the Friends of the Saint Paul Chamber Orchestra inaugurated a Youth Chamber Music Competition in February 2012. The competition coordinator is Annette Conklin. The first winner of the competition was the Quartet Tzigane. In 2013, the competition was divided into two levels of competition based on the age of the participants, and in 2018, a Creative Category was initiated.

Presidents of the Friends of the Saint Paul Chamber Orchestra

Winners of the Youth Chamber Music Competition

External links
 http://www.friendsofthespco.org/ website of the Friends of the Saint Paul Chamber Orchestra
 http://spco-ycmc.org/ website of the Friends of the Saint Paul Chamber Orchestra Youth Chamber Music Competition

Arts organizations based in Saint Paul, Minnesota
Educational organizations based in the United States
Music competitions in the United States
Music organizations based in the United States
Non-profit organizations based in Minnesota
Arts organizations established in 1975
1975 establishments in Minnesota